The MacFarland House is a historic house in Stanford, California. It was built in 1914 for Frank M. MacFarland, a professor of histology at Stanford University. MacFarland was also the president of the California Academy of Sciences from 1934 to 1946. He lived here with his wife, née Olive Knowles Hornbrook, and died in 1951.

The house was designed by architect Arthur Bridgman Clark in the American Craftsman style, with Classical Revival features. It has been listed on the National Register of Historic Places since July 21, 2006.

References

Houses on the National Register of Historic Places in California
National Register of Historic Places in Santa Clara County, California
Neoclassical architecture in California
Houses completed in 1914